Statistics of Czechoslovak First League in the 1935–36 season.

Overview
It was contested by 14 teams, and Sparta Prague won the championship. Vojtěch Bradáč was the league's top scorer with 42 goals.

League standings

Results

Top goalscorers

References

Czechoslovakia - List of final tables (RSSSF)

Czechoslovak First League seasons
1935–36 in Czechoslovak football
Czech